Dysderella is a genus of Asian woodlouse hunting spiders that was first described by P. M. Dunin in 1992.  it contains only two species: D. caspica and D. transcaspica.

References

Araneomorphae genera
Dysderidae
Spiders of Asia